August Milde (born 31 October 1899) was a Polish footballer. He played in three matches for the Poland national football team in 1926.

References

External links
 

1899 births
Year of death missing
Polish footballers
Poland international footballers
Place of birth missing
Association footballers not categorized by position